Naxalbari is a crime thriller web series directed by Partho Mitra. Produced by Arjun Singh Baran and Kartik D. Nishandar, it revolves around an STF agent who goes on a mission to suppress the revival of a Naxal uprising in Gadchiroli.  The series stars Rajeev Khandelwal, Tina Datta and Aamir Ali. It premiered on 28 November 2020 on ZEE5.

Plot 
The story is set in Maharashtra, and revolves around an STF agent who goes on a secret mission to uncover the truth behind a Naxal uprising in his village, Gadchiroli.

Cast 
 Rajeev Khandelwal as Raghav
 Tina Datta as Ketki Maheshwari
 Satyadeep Mishra as Pahan
 Narayani Shastri as Sudha
 Shakti Anand as Binu
 Aamir Ali as Keswani
 Tapan Acharya as Narsing Chandel
 Sreejita De as Prakruti

Episodes

Release 
In June 2020, ZEE5 announced that the show would begin reshooting with proper safety measures. The web series was released on 28 November 2020 on the platform.

Reception 
News18 rated the series 2.5 out of 5 and stated: "Web series director Partho Mitra has made a decent show with the script at hand and considering the run-time of episodes is limited to under thirty minutes each, it does not slack off either and holds attention with various twists and sincere performances backing the teleplay."

Archika Khurana from Times Of India rated the series 3.5 out of 5 and praised Rajeev Khandelwal’s performance. "He has given one of his best performances as STF agent Raghav. He managed to bring intensity and gravitas to his character, especially when he follows the trail of the Naxals."

An India Today review stated, "Rajeev Khandelwal is effortlessly perfect as flawed Raghav. Tina Datta breathes a fresh aura into Ketki, a translator who works with government agencies. Satyadeep Mishra and Sreejita Dey are equally menacing as remorseless Naxal leaders."

A Hindustan Times review stated: "The tightly written and well-enacted plot keeps you on the edge-of-the-seat with not a single dull moment."

References

External links 
 
 Naxalbari on ZEE5

2020 web series debuts
Hindi-language web series
Indian crime television series
Indian web series
Thriller web series
ZEE5 original programming